The 2011–12 Biathlon World Cup – Individual Men will start at Wednesday November 30, 2011 in Östersund and will finish Tuesday March 6, 2012 in Ruhpolding at Biathlon World Championships 2012 event. Defending titlist is Emil Hegle Svendsen of Norway.

Competition format
The 20 kilometres (12 mi) individual race is the oldest biathlon event; the distance is skied over five laps. The biathlete shoots four times at any shooting lane, in the order of prone, standing, prone, standing, totalling 20 targets. For each missed target a fixed penalty time, usually one minute, is added to the skiing time of the biathlete. Competitors' starts are staggered, normally by 30 seconds.

2010-11 Top 3 Standings

Medal winners

Standings

References

- Individual Men, 2011-12 Biathlon World Cup